Birthe Hansen (born June 8, 1944) is a Danish sprint canoer who competed in the mid-1960s. At the 1964 Summer Olympics in Tokyo, she finished fifth in the K-2 500 m event and ninth in the K-1 500 m event.

References
Sports-reference.com profile

1944 births
Canoeists at the 1964 Summer Olympics
Danish female canoeists
Living people
Olympic canoeists of Denmark